The Mark Viduka Medal is an association football award that recognises the best adjudged player/s from the final of the Australia Cup (formally the FFA Cup) each year. Introduced in the first edition of the competition in 2014, the award is named after Mark Viduka, who captained the Australian national team during the 2006 FIFA World Cup. Presented by Football Australia following the final, the recipient/s are determined by a panel of three judges consisting of Viduka, the Australian national team manager and Football Australia's national technical director.

Award recipients 

 Legend
  – Indicates the match went to extra time
  – Indicates the player was on the losing team

Wins by club

Wins by nationality

Wins by playing position

See also
Joe Marston Medal
Johnny Warren Medal
John Kosmina Medal
Michael Cockerill Medal

References

Australia Cup
Australian soccer trophies and awards
Awards established in 2014
2014 establishments in Australia